SFIDA! për Shqipërinë (CHALLENGE! for Albania or simply SFIDA!) is an Albanian political party, founded in 2016. SFIDA is an anti-establishment party that promotes direct democracy, mandate limitation and vetting for politicians. SFIDA is a follow-up of the movement "Ne, Tirana" which supported Gjergj Bojaxhi during local elections in 2015 where he ran as an independent candidate for Tirana's city hall. The party does not have a traditional leader. Instead this role is split between an administrative chairman (held by Hektor Ruci) and a political representative, Gjergj Bojaxhi.

History
In June 2015, Bojaxhi ran as an independent candidate in the local elections for the city hall of Tirana. This candidacy was supported by an organized civil movement called "Ne, Tirana". The elections were won by Erion Veliaj, however Bojaxhi won over 16,000 votes. Based on this significant public support, in 2016 Bojaxhi and several other founders created "SFIDA! për Shqipërinë" in order to extend "Ne, Tirana" to a national scale. SFIDA participated for the first time in the national general elections in June, 2017.

Ideology
Sfida për Shqipërinë is a centrist party.

Parliamentary representation

Links
 sfidapershqiperine.com
 sfida.org.al
 Facebook page

References

2016 establishments in Albania
Political parties established in 2016
Political parties in Albania